Governor Watson may refer to:

Arthur Christopher Watson (1927–2001), Governor of the Turks and Caicos Islands from 1975 to 1978 and Governor of Montserrat from 1985 to 1987
Charles Watson (Royal Navy officer) (1714–1757), Colonial Governor of Newfoundland in 1748
William T. Watson (1849–1917), 49th Governor of Delaware